Nadezhda Morozova may refer to:
 Nadezhda Morozova (ice hockey)
 Nadezhda Morozova (speed skater)